Incongruelaps is an extinct genus of elapid snake from the Encore site of Riversleigh World Heritage Fossil Property in Australia. The holotype (QM F42691) is a Late Miocene approximately 10 million years old, mid trunk vertebrae. Other disarticulated vertebrae, right maxilla and a fragment of the left dentary are presumed to be a single individual based on size comparisons; a chance accumulation of fragment of different unassociated individuals can not be ruled out.

References

Neogene reptiles of Australia
Riversleigh fauna
Fossil taxa described in 2002